Conformance is how well something, such as a product, service or a system, meets a specified standard and may refer more specifically to:

 Conformance testing, testing to determine whether a product or system meets some specified standard
 SNIA Conformance Testing Program, a program trying to bring third-party standards conformance to the storage networking marketplace

See also
 Conformation (disambiguation), a variety of similar concepts applied to chemicals or animals